Mose Alive! is a live album by American pianist, vocalist and composer Mose Allison recorded at the Lighthouse Café in California for the Atlantic label in 1965.

Reception

Allmusic awarded the album 3 stars.

Track listing
All compositions by Mose Allison except as indicated
 "Smashed" – 2:20
 "Seventh Son" (Willie Dixon) – 2:30
 "Fool's Paradise" (Jesse Fuller) – 3:36
 "I Love the Life I Live" (Dixon) – 2:26
 "Since I Fell for You" (Buddy Johnson) – 2:47
 "Love for Sale" (Cole Porter) – 5:17
 "Baby, Please Don't Go" (Joe Williams) – 2:40
 "That's Alright" (Jimmy Rogers) – 2:28
 "Parchman Farm" – 3:11
 "Tell Me Somethin'" – 2:30
 "The Chaser" – 6:44

Personnel 
Mose Allison – piano, vocals
Stanley Gilbert – bass 
Mel Lee – drums

References 

1966 live albums
Mose Allison live albums
Albums produced by Nesuhi Ertegun
Atlantic Records live albums
Albums recorded at the Lighthouse Café